Gillian Stewart (born 21 October 1958) is a Scottish professional golfer who played on the Ladies European Tour (LET) from 1985 to 2000. She recorded three LET wins and was runner-up in eight tournaments. As an amateur, she won the Girls Amateur Championship and played in the Vagliano Trophy, Curtis Cup and Espirito Santo Trophy.

Amateur career
Stewart was educated at Inverness Royal Academy and Edinburgh University, where she majored in Business Studies. Stewart assembled an impressive amateur record. She won the 1976 Girls Amateur Championship and the Scottish Women's Amateur Championship in 1979, 1983 and 1984. She also won the Helen Holm Trophy in 1981 and 1984. She was runner-up at the 1982 British Ladies Amateur and the 1984 Spanish International Ladies Amateur Championship.

Stewart represented Great Britain & Ireland in the 1979, 1981 and 1983 Vagliano Trophy, the 1980 and 1982 Curtis Cup, and the 1982 and 1984 Espirito Santo Trophy. She representing Scotland at the Women's Home Internationals six years consecutively between 1979 and 1984 and at the European Ladies' Team Championship three consecutive tournaments 1979, 1981 and 1983.

She won the 1984 IBM Ladies' European Open at The Belfry, the last amateur to win on the Ladies European Tour for 22 years until 2006 when Amy Yang won the ANZ Ladies Masters.

Professional career
Stewart turned professional in 1985 and won the first tournament she played as a professional, the Ford Ladies Classic at Woburn Golf and Country Club. In 1986, she was runner-up at the Belgian Ladies Open and Trusthouse Forte Ladies' Classic. In 1987, she again won the Ford Ladies Classic, and was runner-up at the Guernsey Open. In 1989, she was runner-up at the Ford Ladies' Classic, Ladies European Open and at the Benson & Hedges Trophy together with Carl Mason. In 1990, she was runner-up at the Longines Classic and the Ladies Swiss Classic.

In 1994, she won the Lalla Meryem Cup, while it was only a non-LET invitational event.

After retiring from tour, she took up coaching and broadcasting, including commentary for the BBC covering The Open Championship and the Barclays Scottish Open.

Amateur wins
1975  Scottish Under-19 Stroke Play Championship
1976 Girls Amateur Championship
1979 Scottish Women's Amateur Championship
1981 Helen Holm Trophy
1983 Scottish Women's Amateur Championship
1984 Scottish Women's Amateur Championship, Helen Holm Trophy

Professional wins (4)

Ladies European Tour wins (3)
1984 IBM Ladies' European Open (as an amateur)
1985 Ford Ladies Classic
1987 Ford Ladies Classic

Other wins (1)
1994 Lalla Meryem Cup

Team appearances
Amateur
European Ladies' Team Championship  (representing Scotland): 1979, 1981, 1983
Vagliano Trophy (representing Great Britain & Ireland): 1979, 1981, 1983
Women's Home Internationals (representing Scotland): 1979 (winners), 1980, 1981, 1982, 1983, 1984
Curtis Cup (representing Great Britain & Ireland): 1980, 1982
Espirito Santo Trophy (representing Great Britain & Ireland): 1982, 1984
Commonwealth Trophy (representing Great Britain): 1979, 1983

References

External links

Scottish female golfers
Ladies European Tour golfers
Alumni of the University of Edinburgh
Sportspeople from Inverness
1958 births
Living people